Nola and the Clones is a feature film from Irish director Graham Jones about a homeless girl in Dublin who encounters a series of men that appear strikingly similar to each other.

Reception
Frank Ochieng of The Critical Movie Critics gave it positive review and wrote: "...vastly affecting...thankfully skilled gems such as Nola and the Clones will remind us that not all moving melodramas about rebellious young women on the edge simply belong on the Lifetime Channel."

References

External links 
 
 

2016 films
Irish drama films
2010s English-language films